Aurantimonas  is a genus of bacteria from the family of Aurantimonadaceae.

References

Hyphomicrobiales
Bacteria genera